This article lists all power stations in Togo.

Hydroelectric

Thermal

Solar

See also 
 List of power stations in Africa
 List of largest power stations in the world

References

External links
  Togo's Infrastructure, Power And Communications

Togo
Power stations